Acallodes is a genus of minute seed weevils in the beetle family Curculionidae. There are at least three described species in Acallodes.

Species
These three species belong to the genus Acallodes:
 Acallodes lysimachiae Fall, 1913 i c
 Acallodes saltoides Dietz, 1896 i c b
 Acallodes ventricosus LeConte, 1876 i c b
Data sources: i = ITIS, c = Catalogue of Life, g = GBIF, b = Bugguide.net

References

Further reading

 
 
 

Curculionidae
Articles created by Qbugbot